Tubod, officially the Municipality of Tubod,  (Maranao: Inged a Tubod), is a 2nd class municipality and capital of the province of Lanao del Norte, Philippines. According to the 2020 census, it has a population of 60,182 people.

The Panguil Bay Bridge, once completed, will be Mindanao's longest bridge, and will connect Tubod to Tangub City in Misamis Occidental. The project, that will cost around US$125,519,000.00, will be obtained through Official Development Assistance of the Korean Export-Import Bank of Korea-Economic Development Cooperation Fund. The bridge is under construction and is expected to be commissioned on December 28, 2020.

Etymology
Tubod derived its name from the spring located at Sitio Baybay in Barangay Poblacion. According to the old folks, even during the longest dry season, the spring will not drain. Tubod comes from the Cebuano language, meaning “the water source”. History pointed out that Christian immigrants from Luzon and Visayas settled in this part of the region.

History 
History pointed out that migrant from the Christian provinces in Visayas and Luzon settled in this part of the region. Latest survey shows that the Christian-Muslim in the municipality is about 97.3.

Republic Act No. 58 separated the Barrios of Tubod, Baroy, Lala, Daromawang, Bolod, Taguiquiron, Sagadan and Princesa from its mother municipality of Kolambugan to become a municipality "Tubod" effective October 17, 1946. On February 3, 1982, Parliamentary Bill No. 568 was enacted by the Batasang Pambansa in session assembled, transferring the site of Provincial Government of Lanao del Norte from Iligan City to Municipality of Tubod, making it the "Capital town" of the Lanao del Norte.

Rufo dela Cruz was sworn into office as the appointed Municipal Mayor on March 14, 1947. In the local election of 1947, Fausto Alvia as elected as Municipal Mayor.

On March 22, 1949, President Elpidio Quirino issued Executive Order No. 208, creating the municipality of Lala from the barrios of Rawaan, Gumagamut, Lala (poblacion), Simpak, Daromawang, Abagan, and Lanipao.

On June 10, 1949, the President Quirino issued Executive Order No. 222 creating the Municipality of Baroy whereby all the elected Municipal Officials except the councilor Arsenio A. Quibranza, opted to served Baroy thus leading to the appointment of the Municipal Officials of Tubod with the Arsenio A. Quibranza as Municipal Mayor effective June 24, 1949.

In 1951 local elections the latter was elected as the Municipal Mayor and was re-elected twice during the 1955 and 1959 local elections, his term ended on March 8, 1962, when he was appointed by President Diosdado Macapagal as Vice Governor of Lanao del Norte. By the law of succession, the Vice Mayor Trifon A. Tabuco became the Municipal Mayor of Tubod and held the position until December 31, 1963. In the 1963 election,  Jesus Perez was elected Municipal Mayor and was re-elected also in the 1967 election whose term ended on December 31, 1971. In 1971 election, the Marcelino Pepito was elected Municipal Mayor whose term ended on January 31, 1979, when Romana dela Cruz Neri too her oath and assumed office as appointed Municipal Mayor. In 1980 election, the latter was elected as the Municipal Mayor whose term ended as an aftermath of the February 25, 1986, EDSA Revolution. The Municipal government of Tubod was governed since by OICs Panfilo dela Cruz, Rooseque B. Calacat and Panfilo Labunog, respectively, until January 31, 1988. In the February 2, 1988, election, the Romana dela Cruz Neri was elected again as the Municipal Mayor of Tubod. She held the same office until she was defeated by Constancio A. Pepito in 1992 synchronized national and local elections, who held the position for three consecutive terms. In 2001 elections,  Eduardo C. Mansueto was elected as Municipal Mayor and held the position for three consecutive terms. During the national and local election in 2010, the Nelieta Quibranza-Noval, who boarded the wagon of politics just like her father the late Arsenio A. Quibranza, was elected as Municipal Mayor and re-elected during the 2016 national and local election but she died on September 7, 2016.

Geography

It is bounded by Panguil Bay and the Municipality of Kolambugan on the North, and Magsaysay on the North East, the municipality of Munai on the East, and the municipalities of Salvador and Nunungan on the South, and the municipality of Baroy on the South West. It has a regular terrain with low planes in the interior and undulating hills to rugged mountains along the Northern portion down to South Eastern portion of the municipality.

Rainfall present every month although it is outside the typhoon belt. Of the total area of the municipality, 289.05 hectares as public lands both alienable and disposable and forestal land, 310 hectares rice land, 73.24 hectares as fishpond and swamp lands and 117.44 hectares as residential land.

Barangays
Tubod is politically subdivided into 24 barangays.

Climate

Demographics

Economy

Banking 
 Landbank of the Philippines
 Development Bank of the Philippines
 Citysavings Bank (A subsidiary of UNIONBANK )
 Rural bank of karomatan
 BDO Network Bank

Tourism

Tubod is the site of the Mindanao Civic Center which houses a hotel, cafeteria, gym, swimming pool, oval, and other sports facilities. MCC is a 71-hectare integrated complex with 5-hectare provincial trade center, 18-hectare sports facilities with 48-hectares still open for the proposed 18-hole golf course, picnic park and sports academy. The gymnasium capacity was 3,500 and the main stadium was 5,000. MCC was the first sports hub of the First Mindanao Friendship Games.

And also, MCC is the site of several motorcross events in the country, giving the distinction of Tubod and the whole province as the "Motorcross Capital of the Philippines".

Culture

Festival
Tubod is primarily an agricultural towny. Of its land area of 24,000, 80.7% is dedicated to agricultural use with a large percentage planted with bananas. Therefore, the ups and downs of the economic situation of the people in the interior barangay is more or less dependent on banana Industry. Cognizant with the bright prospect of banana products playing a vital role of livelihood of the people, in 1986, the LGU of Tubod,Lanao del Norte initiated the conceptualization of a festival that would give an all out emphasis on Council was organizeds to assist the LGU of Tubod in designing what is now known as the Sagingan Festival, as well as to determined priority measures to enhance the product of the economic symbol of Tubod. With close coordination of the Department of Agriculture, the banana yields of Tubod were given special treatment ( ex. Research, variety classification, soil analysis etc.). In 1987, the first Sagingan Festival celebrated by Tubod during the commemoration of the Towns creation (Charter day October 17). The celebration highlighted the presentation of the different varieties of bananas In Tubod (52 varieties as of last count). Seeing the festival enlightens the Tubodnons on the importance of Bananas in generation income, it was enhanced, developed, and sustained by the LGU of Tubod. Indeed, from the time, a portion of the LGU's 20% development fund was allocated for the Sagingan Festival. In 1992, Sagingan Festival was officially accredited with the Department of Tourism and included in the calendar festival in the entire Philippines. There festivals are highlighted with Street dancing Competition, Best Decorated Caromata, Booth Contest, Search for Ms. Sagingan Festival which use of 75% of Banana materials, banana Festival, and Agro-industrial Trade Fair. Folk Dance Competition and Sports Competition were incorporated to add and grandeur to the celebration. Romana dela Cruz-Neri is known as the Grandmother of the Sagingan Festival.

Telecommunication 
Globe Telecom
Smart Communications
TMSI - Fixed line

Healthcare
Tubod Community Hospital - Brgy. San Antonio
Rural Health Unit - Poblacion

Education 
Elementary:
All 24 barangays

Secondary:
Mercy Junior College (Private)
A.A.Q.N.H.S (Bualan)
T.A.Q.N.H.S (Pualas)
L.N.P.S.H.S (Malingao)
Rufo Dela Cruz Integrated School
Dalama Integrated School

Vocational:
TESDA-LNNAIS
Main Campus (Bualan)
Satellite Campus (Tubod)

Tertiary:
Tubod College - the first tertiary school in town (2018-2019)

Media 
SPRING FM 88.3Mhz ( FMR Broadcasting )
DXNE 94.3Mhz
ARANGKADA BAG-ONG TUBOD FACEBOOK PAGE
88.30 Spring FM Tubod-Baroy
Amigoz Advertising Services

References

External links
   Tubod Profile at the DTI Cities and Municipalities Competitive Index
 [ Philippine Standard Geographic Code]
 Official site of Tubod
Philippine Census Information
Local Governance Performance Management System

Municipalities of Lanao del Norte
Provincial capitals of the Philippines